The Star Awards for Best Evergreen Artiste is an award presented annually at the Star Awards, a ceremony that was established in 1994.

The category was introduced in 2016, at the 22nd Star Awards ceremony; Chen Shucheng received the award for his performance in Super Senior and it is given in honour of a Mediacorp veteran artiste who has delivered an outstanding performance in their field of profession. In order to be nominated for the award, the artiste must be over 50 years in age and has garnered over 25 years of performing experience in the industry. The nominees of the award are still eligible to run for other performing categories. The nominees are determined by a team of judges employed by Mediacorp; winners are selected by a majority vote from the entire judging panel.

Since its inception, the award has been given to three veteran artistes. Xiang Yun is the most recent winner in this category. Since the ceremony held in 2022, Xiang Yun remains as the only veteran artiste to win in this category thrice, surpassing Chen who has two wins. In addition, Xiang Yun has been nominated on seven occasions, more than any other veteran artiste. Hong Huifang and Zhu Houren hold the record for the most nominations without a win, with four.

From 2018, the nominees for this award were selected without any reference to their respective work titles.

Recipients

Nominees distribution chart

Award records

Multiple awards and nominations

The following individuals received two or more Best Evergreen Artiste awards:

The following individuals received two or more Best Evergreen Artiste nominations:

References

External links 

Star Awards